Tuan may refer to:

Brush-tailed phascogale, an Australian marsupial animal also known as tuan
Zaiyi (1856–1923), Prince Duan (or Prince Tuan), a Qing Dynasty prince and statesman
Duan (surname), a Chinese surname spelled as Tuan in the older Wade–Giles romanisation
Tuan mac Cairill, a figure in Irish mythology
Tuan (band), an Irish music band formed by Brendan McFarlane
Tuan Tuan and Yuan Yuan, giant pandas sent by mainland China to Taiwan in 2008
Tuan, a respectful Malaysian term meaning "Sir"
Tuan, a Sri Lankan first name originating from the Malaysian term for "Sir" and used by Sri Lankans of Malay origin